Leander of Seville (534 AD, in Cartagena – 13 March 600 or 601, in Seville) was the Bishop of Seville. He was instrumental in effecting the conversion of the Visigothic kings Hermengild and Reccared to Catholicism. His brother (and successor as bishop) was the encyclopedist Saint Isidore of Seville.

Life
Leander, Isidore and their siblings belonged to an elite family of Hispano-Roman stock of Carthago Nova. The family as a matter of course were staunch Catholics, as were most of the Romanized population; the Visigothic nobles and the kings were Arians.

The family moved to Seville around 554. The children's subsequent public careers reflect their distinguished origin: Leander and Isidore both became bishops of Seville, and their sister Florentina was an abbess who directed forty convents and one thousand nuns. The third brother, Fulgentius, was appointed Bishop of Écija. All four siblings are considered saints of the Catholic and Eastern Orthodox Churches.

There was less Visigothic persecution of Catholics than legend and hagiography have painted. From a modern standpoint, the dangers of Catholic Christianity were more political. The Catholic hierarchy were in collusion with the representatives of the Eastern Roman or Byzantine emperor, who had maintained a considerable territory in the far south of Hispania ever since his predecessor had been invited to the peninsula by the former Visigothic king several decades before. In the north, Liuvigild struggled to maintain his possessions on the far side of the Pyrenees, where his Merovingian cousins and brothers-in-law cast envious eyes on them.

Leander, enjoying an elite position in the secure surroundings of tolerated Catholic culture in Seville, became, around 576, a Benedictine monk, and then in 579 he was appointed bishop of Seville. In the meantime he founded a celebrated school, which soon became a center of Catholic learning. As bishop he had access to the Catholic Merovingian princess Ingunthis, who had come as a bride for the kingdom's heir, and he assisted her to convert her husband Hermenegild, the eldest son of Liuvigild, an act that cannot honestly be divorced from a political context. Leander defended the new convert even when he went to war with his father "against his father's cruel reprisals". Pierre Suau puts it, "In endeavoring to save his country from Arianism, Leander showed himself an orthodox Christian and a far-sighted patriot."

Exiled by Liuvigild, as his biographies express it, when the rebellion failed, he withdrew to Byzantium – perhaps quite hastily – from 579 to 582. It is possible, but not proven, that he sought to rouse the Byzantine Emperor Tiberius II Constantine to take up arms against the Arian king; but in any case the attempt was without result. He profited, however, by his stay at Byzantium to compose works against Arianism, and there became acquainted with the future Pope Gregory the Great, at that time legate of Pope Pelagius II at the Byzantine court (Later Gregory sent him a copy of Pastoral Care). A close friendship thenceforth united the two men, and some of their correspondence survives. In 585 Liuvigild put to death his intransigent son Hermenegild, a martyr and saint of the Catholic and Eastern Orthodox Churches. Liuvigild himself died in 589. It is not known exactly when Leander returned from exile, but he had a share in the conversion of Reccared the heir of Liuvigild, and retained an influence over him.

Leander introduced the recitation of the Nicene Creed at Mass, as a way to help reinforce the faith of his people against Arianism. In 589, he convoked the Third Council of Toledo, where Visigothic Hispania abjured Arianism. Leander delivered the triumphant closing sermon which his brother Isidore entitled  ("a homily upon the triumph of the Church and the conversion of the Goths"). On his return from this council, Leander convened a synod in his metropolitan city of Seville (Conc. Hisp., I), and never afterwards ceased his efforts to consolidate the work of extirpating the remains of Arianism, in which his brother and successor St. Isidore was to follow him.

Works
St. Isidore wrote of his brother: "This man of suave eloquence and eminent talent shone as brightly by his virtues as by his doctrine. By his faith and zeal the Gothic people have been converted from Arianism to the Catholic faith" (De script. eccles., xxviii).

Legacy
The city of San Leandro in the US state of California is named after St. Leander. 

The Catholic and Eastern Orthodox Churches recognise feast days for Leander on both 27 February and 13 March for observance in particular circumstances. In the Spanish national liturgical calendar, the feast day is commemorated on 13 November.

See also
List of Catholic saints
Saint Leander of Seville, patron saint archive

References

Attribution

External links
 A glowing report of the homily of Leander

530s births
600s deaths
Year of birth uncertain
Year of death uncertain
People from Cartagena, Spain
Spanish Benedictines
Doctors of the Church
Medieval Spanish saints
Bishops of Seville
6th-century Christian saints
6th-century bishops in the Visigothic Kingdom
6th-century Latin writers